is an action role-playing game for the PlayStation Portable, developed by Access Games and published by Square Enix. A remake titled , was released in Japan and Asia in December 2011 for the PlayStation Vita and PlayStation Portable.

Gameplay 
Lord of Arcana is an action game that allows up to four players to fight monsters and demons, some of which make cameo appearances from other Square Enix games.

The gameplay is very close to that of the Monster Hunter, God Eater, and Phantasy Star Portable series, featuring cinematic kills and mini-games. Players also have the ability to summon monsters to aid them in battle, and can also use magic (e.g. Fire, Light, etc.) to inflict damage on the enemy.

Plot 
Lord of Arcana takes place in a world called Horodyn, named after the land's first king. Somewhere in Horodyn lies an ancient stone known only as "Arcana", which apparently holds great magical power. Unfortunately, as well as humans, the world is home to many great and powerful monsters and beasts, which are fought by warriors known as Slayers who seek Arcana.

Development 
The monsters featured in Lord of Arcana are designed by many artists from around the world. Hitoshi Sakimoto served as the game's sound producer, with the score being composed by Nobuo Uematsu, Kenichiro Fukui, and Satoshi Henmi.

Reception 

Lord of Arcana received "mixed" reviews according to video game review aggregator Metacritic.  In Japan, Famitsu gave it a score of all four eights for a total of 32 out of 40.

References

External links 
Japanese Official Website
International Official Website

2010 video games
Lord of Apocalypse
Action role-playing video games
PlayStation Portable games
Lord of Apocalypse
Square Enix games
Video games scored by Nobuo Uematsu
Video games scored by Kenichiro Fukui
Video games developed in Japan
Video games featuring protagonists of selectable gender